The 1944 Rutgers Queensmen football team represented Rutgers University in the 1944 college football season. In their seventh season under head coach Harry Rockafeller, the Queensmen compiled a 3–2 record and were outscored by their opponents 82 to 58.

Schedule

References

Rutgers
Rutgers Scarlet Knights football seasons
Rutgers Queensmen football